Ceasing to Breathe is the third full-length album by American metalcore band Still Remains.

Critical reception
Robert Garland of Sputnik Music writes: "For all those who see metalcore as a dead or dying subgenre, Still Remains shows hope in the form of bringing back some of their older sounds. Ceasing To Breathe shows an act rising from the ashes." Brody B. from Indie Vision Music says: "Still Remains are back, and what I would say better than ever. Sure they're all grown up now, but I think that tends to add a more polished and complete sound to the band. While they don't bring anything new to the table for the genre, they are able to convince listeners that they are the best at what they do and they have come to take back the throne in the melodic metal scene."

Track listing

Credits
Still Remains
 T.J. Miller – lead vocals
 Jordan Whelan – guitar 
 Mike Church – guitar, vocals
 A.J. Barrette – drums 
 Zach Roth – keyboards, synthesizers 
 Kenny Polidan – bass
Additional Musicians
 Daniel Weydant - guest vocals on track 1

References

2013 albums
Still Remains albums